WIPR (940 AM), branded on-air as WIPR 940 AM, is a public, non-commercial radio station broadcasting a talk radio format. Licensed to San Juan, Puerto Rico, the station is owned by The Puerto Rico Public Broadcasting Corporation.

WIPR's audio signal had been simulcast on WIPR-TV channel 6.6 in San Juan & WIPM-TV channel 3.6 in Mayaguez, but was removed on March 20, 2017.

On November 18, 2020 WIPR was granted a construction permit from the Federal Communications Commission (FCC) to move to a new transmitter site and to decrease power to 3,000 watts day and 1,900 watts night but is still broadcasting at 10,000 watts fulltime.

See also
 WIPR-TV

External links
FCC History Cards for WIPR

IPR
Radio stations established in 1949
1949 establishments in Puerto Rico
News and talk radio stations in Puerto Rico
Public radio
Public broadcasting in Puerto Rico